Māngudi Maruthanār, also known as Mānkudi Kilār, Madhurai Kānchi Pulavar, and Kānchi Pulavanār, was a poet of the Sangam period, to whom 13 verses of the Sangam literature have been attributed, including verse 24 of the Tiruvalluva Maalai. He was the author of Madurai Kaanchi of the Pathupattu (the Ten Idylls).

Biography
Mangudi Marudhanar hailed from the town of Mangudi and belonged to the Vellan caste.

Contribution to the Sangam literature
Mangudi Marudhanar wrote the Madurai Kaanchi literature of the Pathupattu (the Ten Idylls). Besides he has written 13 Sangam verses, including 3 in Kurunthogai, 2 in Natrinai, 6 in Purananuru, 1 in Agananuru, and 1 in Tiruvalluva Maalai.

Views on Valluvar and the Kural
Mangudi Marudhanar opines about Valluvar and the Kural text thus:

See also

 Sangam literature
 List of Sangam poets
 Tiruvalluva Maalai

Notes

References

 

Tamil philosophy
Tamil poets
Sangam poets
Tiruvalluva Maalai contributors